W12 may refer to:

 W12 engine, a twelve-cylinder piston engine in a W configuration
Volkswagen W12 concept car
 W12 nuclear warhead, an American nuclear weapon design
 Hansa-Brandenburg W.12, a 1912 German biplane fighter floatplane
 W12, a postcode district in the W postcode area
 Worms (2007 video game), the twelfth game in the Worms series
Mercedes-AMG F1 W12 E Performance, a 2021 Formula One car